Precious Blood Hospital (Caritas) is a Roman Catholic Community Hospital in Hong Kong, located at No. 113 Castle Peak Road in the Sham Shui Po area of West Kowloon. It is a Roman Catholic Christian hospital, run by the Caritas group, as is Canossa Hospital.

History
The Precious Blood Hospital is composed of three wings. The first two were built in 1937 and 1939. The third one, the George Washington Wing, was built in 1975. The Hospital building suffered considerable damage during the Japanese occupation of Hong Kong (1941–1945). The Hospital was under the administration of the Congregation of the Sisters of the Precious Blood until 1993, when Caritas group took charge of its management. The Hospital was consequently renamed as the Precious Blood Hospital (Caritas).

Healthcare
Precious Blood Hospital offers specialist outpatient and inpatient services in General medicine, Surgery, Obstetrics and Gynaecology, Orthopaedics and Ophthalmology.  

The hospital also runs a General Outpatient clinic and various health check and vaccination programs. 

The hospital is a member of Hong Kong Private Hospitals Association. It is surveyed and accredited bi-annually by QHA Trent Accreditation of the United Kingdom, a major international healthcare accreditation group.

See also 
Canossa Hospital, Hong Kong
List of hospitals in Hong Kong
Hospitals in China
International healthcare accreditation

References

External links

Hospital buildings completed in 1937
Hospital buildings completed in 1939
Hospital buildings completed in 1975
Hospitals in Hong Kong
Medical Services by Catholic community in Hong Kong
Caritas Hong Kong
Hospitals established in 1937
1937 establishments in Hong Kong
Grade III historic buildings in Hong Kong